Carex haydenii, Hayden's sedge, is a species of flowering plant in the family Cyperaceae, native to eastern Canada and the north-central and northeastern United States. Preferring to grow in wet, shady situations, but able to tolerate full sun, it is recommended for rain gardens.

References

haydenii
Flora of Ontario
Flora of Quebec
Flora of New Brunswick
Flora of North Dakota
Flora of South Dakota
Flora of Nebraska
Flora of Minnesota
Flora of Iowa
Flora of Missouri
Flora of Wisconsin
Flora of Illinois
Flora of Indiana
Flora of Michigan
Flora of Ohio
Flora of Pennsylvania
Flora of New York (state)
Flora of Massachusetts
Flora of Vermont
Flora of New Hampshire
Flora of Maine
Plants described in 1854
Flora without expected TNC conservation status